P29 may refer to:

Aircraft 
 Boeing P-29, an American prototype fighter aircraft
 Boulton Paul P.29 Sidestrand, a medium bomber of the Royal Air Force
 Percival P.29 Proctor, a British radio trainer and communications aircraft

Vessels 
 , a cancelled submarine of the Royal Navy
 , a corvette of the Indian Navy
 , of the Armed Forces of Malta

Other uses 
 P29 Highway (Kazakhstan), part of the AH7 road
 Papyrus 29, a biblical manuscript
 Phosphorus-29, an isotope of phosphorus
 Tombstone Municipal Airport, in Cochise County, Arizona, United States
 P29, a Latvian state regional road